Yaroslav Filippovich Cherstvy (Russian: Ярослав Филиппович Черствый; born 1933) is a Russian rower who represented the Soviet Union.

Cherstvy went to the 1956 European Rowing Championships in Bled where he won a silver medal with the coxed four. He competed at the 1956 Summer Olympics in Melbourne with the men's coxed four where they got eliminated in the semi-final. As a member of his rowing club Trud Leningrad he won the Grand Challenge Cup in 1958 as part of the Henley Royal Regatta.

At the 1962 World Rowing Championships in Lucerne, he won silver with the men's eight.

References

1933 births
Living people
Soviet male rowers
Olympic rowers of the Soviet Union
Rowers at the 1956 Summer Olympics
European Rowing Championships medalists
World Rowing Championships medalists for the Soviet Union